WKCB can refer to:

 WKCB (AM), a radio station (1340 AM) licensed to Hindman, Kentucky, United States
 WKCB-FM, a radio station (107.1 FM) licensed to Hindman, Kentucky, United States